Anna Margarete Healey (born 6 December 1995) is an English-born cricketer who plays for the Germany women's national cricket team as an all-rounder. On several occasions, she has been player of the match in a Twenty20 International.

Early life and career 
Healey was born in Maidstone, Kent. She attended Beechwood Sacred Heart School in nearby Royal Tunbridge Wells, and Invicta Grammar School in Maidstone. As a child, she was a member of Kent Young Cricketers and Kent Cricket Performance Squads teams, in which her team mates included future England cricketer Tash Farrant. In 2009, she was the leading wicket taker for the Kent Girls Under 13 team, and in 2013 she won the batting award for the Girls Under 17 team. She has also played at club level for the St Lawrence & Highland Court club based in Bekesbourne, near Canterbury.

In early 2015, Healey spent four months as lead coach of the first XI at Woodford House Anglican girls school in Havelock North, Hawke's Bay, New Zealand. Between 2015 and 2018, she completed a Bachelors degree in Sport and Exercise Science with first class honours at the University of Chichester.

International career 
On 26 June 2019, Healey made her WT20I debut for Germany against Scotland at the La Manga Club Ground, Murcia, Spain, in the first match of the 2019 ICC Women's Qualifier Europe, which was also Germany's first ever WT20I.

In February 2020, in the second WT20I match of a bilateral series between Germany and Oman at the Al Amerat Cricket Stadium, Muscat, Healey took 1 for 5 in three overs with one maiden, scored 33*, and was chosen as player of the match, which Germany won by six wickets.

On 8 July 2021, in the first match of another bilateral series, between Germany and France at the Bayer Uerdingen Cricket Ground, Krefeld, Healey was again awarded player of the match, for combining a score of 29 in 27 balls with two catches and the initiation of a run out. Germany won that match by 9 wickets. The following month, Healey played in all four of Germany's matches in the 2021 ICC Women's T20 World Cup Europe Qualifier.

Personal life
Off the field, Healey works as an ecommerce and distribution manager in East Peckham, Kent.

See also 
 List of Germany women Twenty20 International cricketers

References

External links 
 
 

1995 births
German women cricketers
Expatriate sportspeople in England
Germany women Twenty20 International cricketers
Germany women's national cricket team
Kent women cricketers
Living people